Allodiplogaster is a genus of nematodes (roundworms) in the family Diplogastridae that currently includes about 35 described species.

List of species

henrichae group
Allodiplogaster henrichae
Allodiplogaster colobocerca
Allodiplogaster hirschmannae
Allodiplogaster histophora
Allodiplogaster hylobii
Allodiplogaster incurva
Allodiplogaster labiomorpha
Allodiplogaster lepida
Allodiplogaster lucani
Allodiplogaster pierci
Allodiplogaster pini
Allodiplogaster robinicola
Allodiplogaster sudhausi

striata group
Allodiplogaster angarensis
Allodiplogaster aquatica
Allodiplogaster baicalensis
Allodiplogaster carinata
Allodiplogaster didentata
Allodiplogaster filicaudata
Allodiplogaster ivanegae
Allodiplogaster lupata
Allodiplogaster mordax
Allodiplogaster mulveyi
Allodiplogaster pantolaba
Allodiplogaster pararmata
Allodiplogaster regia
Allodiplogaster ruricula
Allodiplogaster sphagni
Allodiplogaster strenua
Allodiplogaster striata
Allodiplogaster tenuipunctata
Allodiplogaster terranova

References

Diplogastridae